Chad Gaffield  is a Canadian historian. He is the University Research Chair Professor in Digital Scholarship at University of Ottawa and also a fellow of the Royal Society of Canada.

In 2017, he was appointed an Officer of the Order of Canada by Governor General David Johnston for "leadership in interdisciplinary and multi-institutional collaboration as a historian and administrator, and for his pioneering work in the digital humanities".  He currently serves on the advisory board of the Leaders' Debates Commission.

References

Year of birth missing (living people)
Living people
Academic staff of the University of Ottawa
21st-century Canadian historians
Fellows of the Royal Society of Canada
Officers of the Order of Canada
Presidents of the Canadian Historical Association